The Austrian men's national under 20 ice hockey team is the national under-20 ice hockey team in Austria. The team represents Austria at the International Ice Hockey Federation's IIHF World Junior Championship.

History

Austria made its first Pool A appearance in 1981, however, after being relegated the team spent several years competing in either Pool B or Pool C. In 2000, the Austrians defeated Slovenia 6–2 to advance out of Pool C and into Division I for the 2001 World Junior Ice Hockey Championships. Austria finally qualified for the top level for 2004, by defeating Norway 6–4 in their final contest. Austria however was relegated back to Division I for 2005. The team has been unable to maintain a steady presence as part of the Top Division, their most recent appearance being in 2010. They have not won a game at the top level in four appearances, but did tie Ukraine in 2004.

World Junior Championship record

Awards and honours

Directorate Awards

References

External links
Official website

Ice hockey
Junior national ice hockey teams